Lady Troubridge may refer to:

Una Vincenzo, Lady Troubridge (1887–1963), British sculptor and translator
Laura Troubridge, Lady Troubridge (1867–1946), British novelist and etiquette writer
 Lady Troubridge, a British ship that was shipwrecked in 1815

See also
 Troubridge (disambiguation)